Ideal language philosophy is contrasted with ordinary language philosophy. From about 1910 to 1930, analytic philosophers like Bertrand Russell and Ludwig Wittgenstein emphasized creating an ideal language for philosophical analysis, which would be free from the ambiguities of natural language that, in their opinion, often made for philosophical error. During this phase, Russell and Wittgenstein sought to understand language (and hence philosophical problems) by using formal logic to formalize the way in which philosophical statements are made. Wittgenstein developed a comprehensive system of logical atomism in his Tractatus Logico-Philosophicus (1921). He thereby argued that the universe is the totality of facts and not things: actual states of affairs and that these states of affairs can be expressed by the language of first-order predicate logic. Thus a picture of the universe can be construed by means of expressing atomic facts in the form of atomic propositions, and linking them using logical operators. Wittgenstein's Tractatus was composed as an elaborate work of philosophical irony ("nonsense"). In other words, he was demonstrating how such a way of thinking is absurd.

See also
 Formal language theory

References

 
 

Analytic philosophy